The Song of Night (German: Das Lied einer Nacht) is a 1932 German musical comedy film directed by Anatole Litvak and starring Jan Kiepura, Magda Schneider and Fritz Schulz.

It was made at the Babelsberg Studios in Berlin. The film's sets were designed by Werner Schlichting. A separate English-language version Tell Me Tonight was made, also directed by Litvak.

Cast
 Jan Kiepura as Enrico Ferraro  
 Magda Schneider as Mathilde  
 Fritz Schulz as Koretzky  
 Otto Wallburg as Pategg  
 Ida Wüst as Mrs. Pategg  
 Margo Lion as Manager of Ferraro  
 Julius Falkenstein as Balthasar

References

Bibliography 
 Murphy, Robert. Directors in British and Irish Cinema: A Reference Companion. British Film Institute, 2006.

External links 
 

1932 films
1932 musical comedy films
German musical comedy films
Films of the Weimar Republic
1930s German-language films
Films directed by Anatole Litvak
German multilingual films
UFA GmbH films
Cine-Allianz films
German black-and-white films
Films shot at Babelsberg Studios
1932 multilingual films
1930s German films